The following table presents a listing of Burundi's 18 provinces ranked in order of their surface area.

References

See also
Burundi
Provinces of Burundi
Geography of Burundi
List of Burundian provinces by population

Provinces, area